Roll with the New is the second comedy album by Chris Rock. It is a combination of live material (also seen in his special Bring the Pain) and comedy sketches. The album won the 1998 Grammy Award for Best Spoken Comedy Album.

Tracks
 Opening/Crickets
 Marion Barry/Million Man March
 This Show Sucks #1
 Luther Campbell
 Cheap Pete
 Tossed Salad
 Press Conference
 O.J., I Understand
 O.J. & O'Jays
 Champagne
 This Show Sucks #2
 Niggas vs. Black People
 I Loved the Show
 Introducing Mary Wong
 My Favorite Joke
 This Show Sucks #3
 Bad Phone Sex
 I'm Back
 Another Face Song
 The Commitment Dilemma/Closing

Personnel
 Produced by Prince Paul
 Associate producer: Merry Harper
 Executive producer: Chris Rock
 Performers: Chris Rock, Jim Breuer, Mario Joyner, Tracy Morgan, Dave Chappelle, Ali Leroi,

Certifications

References

Chris Rock albums
1997 live albums
Grammy Award for Best Comedy Album
Albums produced by Prince Paul (producer)
DreamWorks Records live albums
1990s comedy albums